PKG or Pkg may refer to

.pkg file extension
 Package (disambiguation)
Pangkor Airport, which is assigned the IATA code USM
Penkridge railway station, Staffordshire, National Rail station code PKG
pkg, Image Packaging System used to install the Solaris Operating systems and its applications
 The pkg(8) command-line utility for installing and managing FreeBSD packages
 Protein kinase G